Pakhal Lake is a man-made lake in the Pakhal Wildlife Sanctuary in the Warangal district of Telangana, a state in Southern India.

History
Pakhal Lake is an artificial lake situated in the Pakhal sanctuary close to Warangal City in Telangana. Believed to have been constructed in 1213 A.D by order of the Kakatiya King Ganapathidev, the lake encompasses an area of 30 sq km. Set around the lake is the Pakhal Wildlife Sanctuary spread over an area of 900 sq km.

Tourism
Pakhal Lake, situated amidst forested undulating hills and dales, is a popular tourist retreat. 
Set around the shores of this lake is the Pakhal Wild Life Sanctuary with an area of 839 km2. It is a dense forest shelter with a variety of flora and fauna.

Fauna 
Many wild animals have found refuge around the lake, such as leopards, panthers, wild boars, hyenas, sloths and others. Cobras, pythons, crocodiles and many species of migratory birds can also be seen here.

Location 
Pakhal Lake is situated about 50  km east of Warangal. It is well connected by road, tourists can get there via state-run buses or by private vehicles.

References

External links 

Reservoirs in Telangana